A paralithic horizon is a weathered layer of bedrock. The term comes from the Greek words para, meaning "akin to", and lithic, meaning "stony".

References

Geology terminology
Pedology